The World Wrestling All-Stars (WWA) World Heavyweight Championship was a professional wrestling world heavyweight championship in World Wrestling All-Stars. It was the primary championship in the WWA. The title was sanctioned by WWA as their world championship and defended in multiple countries. It was unified with the NWA Worlds Heavyweight Championship on May 25, 2003.

History
The WWA World Heavyweight Championship was unveiled in 2001 and first won by Road Dogg on October 23, 2001 by defeating Jeff Jarrett in Australia. Shortly after, however, the title was vacated for WWA's first pay-per-view, The Inception, on October 26, 2001.  There, the title was contested in a tournament won by Jeff Jarrett.  The title was contested in the WWA as its primary title until May 25, 2003, where the title was unified with the National Wrestling Alliance Worlds Heavyweight Championship in Auckland, New Zealand by Jeff Jarrett, the NWA Worlds Heavyweight Champion, who defeated Sting, the WWA World Heavyweight Champion.

Title history

List of combined reigns

References

World Wrestling All-Stars championships
World heavyweight wrestling championships
Professional wrestling in Australia